Vä is a former town in Scania, now a village in the municipality of Kristianstad in Sweden, ca 5 km southwest of the town of Kristianstad.

History
The name stems from the old Danish word væ, meaning "cult place or holy ground".

Vä Church is one of the oldest stone churches in Sweden, and contains some of the oldest and most monumental church murals in Sweden.

The first written mentioning of Vä as a town is from the 1250s, but already in the early 13th century, the place is mentioned in the Danish Census Book, by King Valdemar. The town was burnt many times. Most notable are the burnings by Karl Knutsson in 1452, Svante Sture in 1509, in 1569 by the Swedish duke Charles (later king Charles IX.

The most infamous burning of Væ, as well as the last, was done by the Swedish King Gustaf II Adolf in 1612. Væ (as of then) was the largest settlement within 24 Danish parishes which the young Swedish king burned down more or less for his own pleasure and without meeting any resistance whatsoever. For this, there exists an exceptional good source. The king boasted of his crimes against civilian Danes in a letter to a cousin which is stored at the Swedish National Archive.

The destroyed town was two years later replaced by Christianstad by the Danish king Christian IV, which was built in 1614 on the island of Allø, today's Kristianstad. The destroyed Væ lost its privileges as a town and became a substitute for the farmers from nearby villages of Næsby and Nosaby, who had in their turn had to give up land to build Kristianstad, along with the former town of Åhus.

Today, there are some remains of the former church buildings; in addition to the church, there is also an old wall with pillars and a brick cairn that was the old church of Saint Gertrude and remains of old streets.

References

Sources
 Nordisk Familjebok
 Salmonsens konversationslexikon

Populated places in Skåne County